The 2009 The Caversham International was a professional tennis tournament played on outdoor hard courts. It was part of the 2009 ATP Challenger Tour. It took place in Jersey, Channel Islands between 23 and 29 March 2009.

Singles entrants

Seeds

Rankings are as of March 16, 2009.

Other entrants
The following players received wildcards into the singles main draw:
  Daniel Cox
  Daniel Evans
  Colin Fleming
  Joshua Milton

The following players received entry from the qualifying draw:
  Jean-Noel Insausti
  Jonathan Marray
  Igor Sijsling
  Phillip Simmonds

Champions

Men's singles

 Daniel Evans def.  Jan Minář, 6–3, 6–2

Men's doubles

 Eric Butorac /  Travis Rettenmaier def.  Colin Fleming /  Ken Skupski, 6–4, 6–3

External links
Lawn Tennis Association (LTA) official website
ITF search 

The Caversham International
The Jersey International